Phosphoserine aminotransferase (PSA) also known as phosphohydroxythreonine aminotransferase (PSAT) is an enzyme that in humans is encoded by the PSAT1 gene.

The protein encoded by this gene is likely a phosphoserine aminotransferase, based on similarity to proteins in mouse, rabbit, and Drosophila. Alternative splicing of this gene results in two transcript variants encoding different isoforms.

Clinical significance 

Homozygous or compound heterozygous mutations in PSAT1 cause Neu–Laxova syndrome and phosphoserine aminotransferase deficiency.

Model organisms

Model organisms have been used in the study of PSAT1 function. A conditional knockout mouse line, called Psat1tm1a(KOMP)Wtsi was generated as part of the International Knockout Mouse Consortium program — a high-throughput mutagenesis project to generate and distribute animal models of disease to interested scientists.

Male and female animals underwent a standardized phenotypic screen to determine the effects of deletion. Twenty four tests were carried out on mutant mice and two significant abnormalities were observed. No homozygous mutant embryos were identified during gestation, and therefore none survived until weaning. The remaining tests were carried out on heterozygous mutant adult mice; no additional significant abnormalities were observed in these animals.

See also 
 Phosphoserine transaminase

References

Further reading

External links 
 

Genes mutated in mice
EC 2.6.1